Greendoor is an unincorporated community in Johnson County, in the U.S. state of Missouri.

History
A post office called Greendoor was established in 1890, and remained in operation until 1902. The community was so named because the local post office had a green door.

References

Unincorporated communities in Johnson County, Missouri
Unincorporated communities in Missouri